Char Khab (also Romanized as Chár Khāb and ChárkhĀb) is a village in Ashkezar Rural District, in the Central District of  Yazd Province, Iran. In the year 2018,its population was 145, in 39 families.

References 

Populated places in Saduq County